John Irving Rinaker (November 1, 1830 – January 15, 1915) was a U.S. Representative from Illinois and a brigade commander in the Union Army during the American Civil War.

Biography
Born in Baltimore, Maryland, Rinaker moved with his parents to Springfield, Illinois, in December 1836. He attended the Illinois College for one term and graduated from McKendree College, Lebanon, Illinois, in 1851.

He subsequently studied law and was admitted to the bar in 1854 and commenced practice in Carlinville, Illinois.

With the outbreak of the Civil War he raised and organized the 122nd Regiment, Illinois Volunteer Infantry, in 1862 and was commissioned as its first colonel on September 4, 1862. He served in the Western Theater of the American Civil War and commanded a brigade in the XVI Corps of the Army of the Tennessee. In the omnibus promotions at the end of the war, he was brevetted brigadier general dating from March 13, 1865.

Rinaker served as delegate to the Republican National Conventions in 1876 and 1884 and then was chairman of the Board of Railroad and Warehouse Commissioners of Illinois 1885-1889. He successfully contested as a Republican the election of Finis E. Downing to the Fifty-fourth Congress and served from June 5, 1896, to March 3, 1897. He was an unsuccessful candidate for reelection in 1896 to the Fifty-fifth Congress.

Rinaker returned to Carlinville, Illinois, and resumed the practice of law. He died in Eustis, Florida, January 15, 1915. He was interred in the City Cemetery, Carlinville, Illinois.

References

External links 
 
 

1830 births
1915 deaths
Illinois lawyers
McKendree University alumni
Politicians from Baltimore
People from Carlinville, Illinois
Politicians from Springfield, Illinois
Union Army colonels
People of Illinois in the American Civil War
Republican Party members of the United States House of Representatives from Illinois
19th-century American politicians
19th-century American lawyers